Fikru Teferra Lemessa (born 24 January 1986) is an Ethiopian professional footballer who last played as a forward for Mohammedan SC.

Club career
Teferra moved to the Czech First League club FK Mladá Boleslav on a three-year deal to stay in the Boleslav club, but was released from the contract before the end of his first season with the club.

He signed a contract with ABSA Premiership outfit SuperSport United in 2010, but was released in 2011.

On 12 October 2014, Teferra made history by scoring the first goal in the Indian Super League, a 28th-minute shot from the edge of the penalty box in a 3–0 victory for Atlético de Kolkata over Mumbai City FC. He also opened the scoring in their second match, a 2–0 win at NorthEast United. On 25 October 2014, he was given a two match ban for headbutting Gregory Arnolin in a match against FC Goa.

On 19 December 2014, it was reported that Teferra was released by Atletico de Kolkata due to a hamstring injury.

A month later, on 22 January 2015, after trialing with Bidvest Wits F.C. of the South African Premiership, that Teferra had signed a six-month contract with the club. He later signed for Chennaiyin FC in 2015 Indian Super League season. He made 11 appearances and he scored against Atlético de Kolkata.

Fikru signed one-year contract with Bangladesh Premier League side Sheikh Russel KC for 10000 US$ salary per month on 21 February 2016.
In March 2018 fikru joined Mohammedan SC of I-League 2nd division.

International career
Teferra was captain of the Ethiopia national team that participated in the 2012 CECAFA Cup.

Career statistics

Honours
St George
 Ethiopian Premier League: 2004–05, 2005–06
 Ethiopian Super Cup: 2005

Atlético de Kolkata
 Indian Super League: 2014

Chennaiyin FC
 Indian Super League: 2015

References

External links

1986 births
Living people
Sportspeople from Addis Ababa
Ethiopian footballers
Association football forwards
Ethiopia international footballers
Ethiopian Premier League players
South African Premier Division players
Czech First League players
Veikkausliiga players
V.League 1 players
Indian Super League players
Calcutta Football League players
Saint George S.C. players
Orlando Pirates F.C. players
SuperSport United F.C. players
FK Mladá Boleslav players
Kuopion Palloseura players
Thanh Hóa FC players
Free State Stars F.C. players
University of Pretoria F.C. players
ATK (football club) players
Bidvest Wits F.C. players
Chennaiyin FC players
Sheikh Russel KC players
Highlands Park F.C. players
Mohammedan SC (Kolkata) players
Adama City F.C. players
Ethiopian expatriate footballers
Ethiopian expatriate sportspeople in the Czech Republic
Expatriate footballers in the Czech Republic
Ethiopian expatriate sportspeople in South Africa
Expatriate soccer players in South Africa
Ethiopian expatriate sportspeople in Finland
Expatriate footballers in Finland
Ethiopian expatriate sportspeople in India
Expatriate footballers in India
Ethiopian expatriate sportspeople in Bangladesh
Expatriate footballers in Bangladesh